Christopher Atkinson (fl. 1652-5, dates of birth and death unknown) was an early Quaker missionary from Westmorland and one of the Valiant Sixty. Already married, he caused a minor scandal among the Society by attempting to seduce another woman.

References 

English Quakers
Converts to Quakerism
17th-century English people